Santiago Sosa (born 3 May 1999) is an Argentine professional footballer who plays as a midfielder for Major League Soccer club Atlanta United.

Club career
Sosa's career began with Mercedes, before River Plate signed him in 2018. The 2018–19 campaign saw Sosa become a senior member of the club's first-team, he made his professional career debut in a 2018 Copa Libertadores fixture with Racing Club on 29 August 2018; he featured for the remaining sixteen minutes as River Plate won 3–0. He ended the aforementioned season with five total appearances.

Atlanta United
In February 2021, Sosa signed with Major League Soccer club Atlanta United. On 6 April 2021, Sosa made his club debut in their 1–0 victory over Alajuelense in the CONCACAF Champions League. He then scored his first goal for Atlanta United on 4 May 2021 against the Philadelphia Union in the Champions League, the match ending in a 1–1 draw.

International career
Sosa, whilst with River Plate, represented the Argentina U20 team; including in training sessions with the seniors. Sosa was selected for the 2019 South American U-20 Championship. He also made the squad for the 2019 FIFA U-20 World Cup in Poland, where he made four appearances in the tournament.

Career statistics

References

External links
 Profile at Atlanta United

1999 births
Living people
Footballers from La Plata
Argentine footballers
Argentina youth international footballers
Argentina under-20 international footballers
Association football midfielders
Argentine Primera División players
Club Atlético River Plate footballers
Atlanta United FC players
Expatriate soccer players in the United States
Argentine expatriate footballers
Argentine expatriate sportspeople in the United States
Major League Soccer players